"Amazing" is a song written by Australian singer-songwriter Alex Lloyd. The song was released on 17 September 2001 as the second single from his second studio album, Watching Angels Mend (2001). It was a success in Australia, reaching number 14, and in New Zealand, where it topped the singles chart in March 2002. It was also ranked number one on the Triple J Hottest 100 of 2001, Australia's largest annual music poll. The song is an example of the evergreen 'four chords of pop' progression.

At the ARIA Music Awards of 2002, the song was nominated for Single of the Year and Highest Selling Single, losing out on both to "Can't Get You Out of My Head" by Kylie Minogue. At the APRA Music Awards of 2002 the song won the 'Song of the Year' award. In January 2018, as part of Triple M's "Ozzest 100", the 'most Australian' songs of all time, "Amazing" was ranked number 80. Lloyd was interviewed on Double J for the 20th anniversary of the song topping Triple J "Hottest 100". He stated that the song was written as a "beautiful goodbye" to a relationship with an older, more experienced partner.

Music video
The video clip of this song was filmed around the Southern Highlands in New South Wales. It features a schoolgirl named Sarah living in the year 1976. One day while travelling to school by bus, Sarah notices a young man walking near the road. Desperately, she decides to skip school and have her own freedom including writing her name in a local toilet, rowing a boat, drawing a picture and walking around the streets in her local town. Unfortunately, Sarah's chance of freedom was cut short when her mum caught her in a library. At the end, Sarah is back in uniform the next day and waits for a bus to get to school.

Track listing
 Australian CD single
 "Amazing" – 3:24
 "Downtown" – 4:45
 "My Way Home" (XFM live session) – 4:20
 "What a Year" (XFM live session) – 4:00

Personnel
 Magnus Fiennes – keyboards
 Shawn Lee – drums
 Alex Lloyd – bass guitar, acoustic guitar, electric guitar, vocals
 Ged Lynch – percussion

Charts

Weekly charts

Year-end charts

Certification

Release history

Other uses
In 2004 the song was licensed for use in advertisements for the Ford Territory 4-wheel drive (SUV) vehicle. It has been used in two other TV advertisements, reportedly earning Lloyd payments of "hundreds of thousands of dollars". In 2008, truck driver Mark O'Keefe sued Lloyd, claiming that the two of them wrote the song together on "a series of beer coasters" at a hotel in 1991 when Lloyd was 16, and that accordingly Lloyd owed him royalties. Lloyd denied ever meeting O'Keefe.

References

2001 singles
2001 songs
Alex Lloyd songs
APRA Award winners
EMI Records singles
Nettwerk Records singles
Number-one singles in New Zealand
Songs containing the I–V-vi-IV progression